, also known as Maho Girls PreCure!, is a 2016 Japanese anime television series by Toei Animation and the thirteenth installment in Izumi Todo's Pretty Cure metaseries, featuring the eleventh generation of Cures. The series, directed by Masato Mitsuka and written by Isao Murayama with character design by Emiko Miyamoto, aired on ANN television stations between February 2016 and January 2017, succeeding Go! Princess PreCure in its initial timeslot, and was succeeded by Kirakira Pretty Cure a la Mode. The series' main topic is friendship, while the series’ motifs are magic and jewelry. A sequel series has been announced by Toei, and will air in 2024.

Story
Mirai Asahina, a thirteen-year-old girl who is excited by various things, goes with her stuffed bear, Mofurun, to investigate a mysterious object that fell from the sky. There, she meets a young magician named Riko who is searching for something known as the Linkle Stone Emerald. When dark servants of Dokurokushe come seeking the Linkle Stone Emerald, Mirai and Riko join hands with Mofurun and transform into the legendary magicians known as the Pretty Cures to fight against them. Thus, Mirai joins Riko in attending Magic School, where they must learn how to use magic while also fighting off Dokurokushe's minions.

Characters

Witchy Pretty Cures
The Witchy Pretty Cures are legendary magicians who once fought against evil, each possessing immensely powerful magic and items called . In the modern day, Mirai and Riko both inherit the powers of the legendary magicians in order to search for the Emerald Linkle Stone. All magicians in the Magical World can perform spells with their wands by chanting the phrase . By using different Linkle Stones, the Cures can transform into four different styles; Diamond, Ruby, Sapphire, and Topaz, allowing them to use different kinds of magic.

Main Characters
 

The main protagonist. She is a lovely and energetic girl who is interested in many things, especially magicians and witches. Though she has no friends, she usually goes out with her teddy bear Mofurun in all places until she meets Riko. After she and Riko became Pretty Cures, she begins attending magic school, where she discovers her own talent is magic. Her family runs an accessories and jewelry shop. Following Deusmast's death, she enrolls in college.
Her theme color is pink, while her style's colors are red, blue, and yellow. 

 

The sub protagonist. Though she is good at studying and often believes her calculations to be correct, she is not that good at casting magic on her own and often has trouble riding her broom - thus making her more of a "miracle"-type person. After her world is targeted by the Dark Magicians, she decides to search for the Linkle Stone Emerald, only for her to meet up with Mirai for the first time. Liz is the one who gave her the Diamond Linkle Stone, and she wants to surpass her to become a famous witch. After passing the test, she was allowed to leave her homeland and follow Mirai to No Magic World when she learns the other Linkle Stones are hidden in No Magic World. Following Deusmast's death, she stays in Magic World until she reunited with Mirai and Kotoha. It is later revealed that she became a teacher at Magic School.
Her theme color is purple, while her style's colors are red, blue, and yellow. 

   

A mysterious baby fairy who resides in the Linkle Smartbook. As the series progress, her age rapidly grows, and she begins to speak. By eating food that comes from using Linkle Stones with the Linkle Smartbook, she can change into various forms, each with its own abilities. Sparda believed that she might be related to the Linkle Stones during their first encounter, especially to the Emerald Linkle Stone. She disappeared along with Kushe after the battle. She appears as a girl named Kotoha Hanami during her encounter with the Cures and rescues them as Cure Felice, yet they were unaware of her identity as Ha-chan before seeing her image as they reunited with each other. She was also allowed to live at Mirai's house alongside Riko. Orba reveals that her powers are inherited by Mother Rapapa. She remains her current age after Deusmast's death.
Her theme color is green.

Partner Doll
 

A teddy bear given to Mirai by her grandmother when she was a baby, who the former treats as a dear friend. Following Mirai and Riko's first transformation into Pretty Cures, Mofurun comes to life, serving as the girls' transformation device. Mofurun can detect the presence of other Linkle Stones as a sweet scent and often ends sentences with "mofu". In the film Witchy PreCure! the Movie: The Miraculous Transformation! Cure Mofurun!, she receives an exclusive Pretty Cure form named Cure Mofurun through the powers of the Linkle Stone Mofurun and, later, the Linkle Stone Heartful. In this form, she can properly fight alongside the other Cures and can also gain similar styles through different Linkle Stones. Cure Mofurun can also summon the Rainbow Carriage at will and unlock the Heartful Styles for her and the other Cures for the final attack: the Heartful Rainbow.
Her theme color is yellow, while its style's colors are red and blue.

Magic School

Teachers

The principal of the Magic School, who is also the greatest magician of the Magic World. When he saw Mirai and Riko transform into Pretty Cure, he proposes that Mirai attends Magic Classes to improve her skills. He met Kanoko when she was young, saving her cat and receiving cookies from her. He becomes older after he battles Dokurokushe in his lair. He was restored to normal along with Magic Crystal after Dokurokushe's demise.

The head teacher of Magic School.

 

A mysterious woman who communicates with the Headmaster through a crystal ball. She is very moody as is always being misunderstood by the Head Teacher. She becomes older after she and Headmaster battle Dokurokushe in his lair. She was restored to normal along with Headmaster after Dokurokushe's demise.

A somewhat forgetful teacher who teaches supplementary classes.

Riko's older sister and a teacher trainee at the Magic School, who once owned the Diamond Linkle Stone before giving it to Riko. She is highly skilled at both studies and magic and is often brought on to teach lessons.

A teacher in Mermaid's village.

Students

A blue-haired student who has a tomboyish personality and often skips classes, giving her a bad attendance record.

An orange-haired student who has two bad habits: she is often tardy and loses her belongings for exams.

A yellow-haired student who is easily frightened. She winds up in supplementary classes due to being scared of spiders or flying her broom in the highest skies with the other students.

  

Resident of Mermaid's Village. Following Deusmast's death, they enroll to Magic School.

Antagonists

Dark Magicians
The  are the main antagonists of the first half of the series, whose goal is to acquire the Linkle Stone Emerald so their leader Dokurokushe can conquer the Magic World and the No Magic World with his dark magic. They also want the Linkle Smarthon after discovering Ha-chan's power. With the exception of Dokurokushe, his subordinates were originally animals which he infused with his magic to assume humanoid form and act in his stead due to his physical condition.

Leaders

 
 (Kushe)
The main antagonist in the first half of the series and leader of Dark Magicians, a power-hungry skeleton magician with great magical prowess yet is firmly stationed on his throne due to his ailing physical constitution. Dokurokushe rarely moves or talks with Yamoh the only one to interpret his body movements as commands. In truth, Kushe was originally a Magic School school teacher who a close friend of the Headmaster before obsession in studying magic to prevent a great calamity resulted in him turning to the dark arts which reduced his body into a skeleton with a desire to obtain the Linkle Stone Emerald to dominate the world.
After obtaining the Linkle Stone Emerald and Smartbook, he absorbs their powers to transform into a giant demonic skeleton to fight the Pretty Cure. Yamoh begged him to be absorbed as well, to strengthen him, but even this action could not overpower Pretty Cure. Kushe’s spirit leaves his body as it breaks apart, Yamoh using the remains to create a more powerful Yokubaru.
As a skeleton, his mostly passive role makes his personality hard to describe, but his actions sometimes remind of his past kindness. He gave the animals the gift of magic, making them able to become powerful magicians on their own. He also kept a photo of the Headmaster and himself in the book of dark magic that he wrote. Finally, his ghost returned to the effigy Yamoh made of him, aiding his subordinates in battle once more, then disappearing for good.

A humanoid gecko and Dokurokushe's second-in-command. An eccentric short-sized clairvoyant, his fancy garments and curly white hair remind of western fashion in the period 1700–1750. He can predict using his cauldron. He is in charge of leading the others under Dokurokushe’s order, and can interpret Dokurokushe's body movements. He often worries about Dokurokushe’s health, and wants nothing more than his master succeeding in his goals.
He was absorbed by Dokurokushe during his final fight with Pretty Cure, but lost his tail before. Out of the remains of the tail, he was revived by Labut with a slightly altered appearance - his garments are simpler, darker in colour and his hair is loose. Appalled by Dokurokushe’s demise, he uses Dokurokushe’s bones to creates stronger Yokubaru and seeks revenge. He also makes an effigy of Dokurokushe and reports his progress to it. He uses Dokurokushe’s last bone to fuse himself into a Yokubaru to capture Kotoha, and thus, the Linkle Stone Emerald. But he ends up defeated as well, and becomes a regular gecko again. Even in this moment, he seeks the company of the effigy. He shows up together with the effigy and along with the rest of his group is fused into a Yokubaru by Batty to fight Orba's Don Yokubaru. After this, he left together with Batty, still in his animal form.

He was restored back into his humanoid form by his love for his master after witnessing his return, or so it seems. The last remaining bone of Dokurokushe was the tooth Yamoh pulled out a long time ago after it had a cavity. The spirit remaining in the tooth revived into an entity who loves sweets and resembles the effigy Yamoh created. Chikurun supports Yamoh by supplying him with honey to make this version of Dokurokushe happy.

Subordinates

A polite humanoid bat dressed up in formal attire, with a long cape that allows him to fly. He deems Yamoh suspicious and accuses him of making up his orders. Dokurokushe then finally talks to Batty and powers him up, and he becomes highly loyal towards Dokurokushe and is depressed due to not being able to protect his master, calling himself a failure. Batty is attentive to his teammates, observing their respective final fights and taking them to their lair when they reverted to their animal forms. Sparda and Gamets, in their animal forms, lend him their wands to transform him into a powerful monster, and after his defeat he still keeps his humanoid form. When he tries to grab the Linkle Stone Emerald, its extracted his magic and reverted him to his original state before being found Sparda and restored to his human form by Orba. But Batty, feeling depressed, does not want to fight anymore. When Orba mocks dark magic, he gets fired up again and defeats Orba's Don Yokubaru with a Yokubaru combined from all his friends. He then leaves with them. Following Deusmast's death, he started to enroll at the Magic School.

A cunning tactician and humanoid spider, who uses webs to snatch objects and for combat purposes. She is very direct and somewhat rude in personality. She loves dark magic and is the most invested in Dokurokuxy's idea of a world ruled by it. Sparda experiments with her magic, including living beings in it at times and pioneering fusing oneself into Yokubaru. While a tactician, her decisions are reckless, as the Yokubaru fusion ended up hurting her and she struggled to control it. Pretty Cure defeated her in this form, and she becomes a regular spider. She was taken home by Batty.
Later in the series, Orba, seeking to learn more about dark magic, gave her back her humanoid form. She seemingly acts as his loyal servant, but it turns out to be a ploy to resurrect her teammates and steal Dokurokushe’s book from Orba. Orba turns her back into a regular spider, but she becomes part of a Yokubaru fusion that defeats Orba's Don Yokubaru. After that, she leaves with Batty and the others.

A strong soldier and humanoid turtle, dubbing himself a magic warrior instead of a magician. He dresses up like a Roman legionary and seeks fights like with the Precure mainly to test his strength. He stole the Linkle Stone Garnet and uses a secret magic to make himself very tall and more nimble, bursting his shell in the process. In this form, he challenged the Cures to fight him on a remote island. Following his defeat, he is satisfied by his defeat as he reverts to his original state. After being revived by Orba, Sparda goads Gamets into standing against Pretty Cure by using group's third member as incentive. He is angry at Orba and tries to fight him together with Sparda when Orba interrupts this "sacred battle" with Cure Felice. He is turned back into a regular turtle and becomes part of the Yokubaru fusion that defeats Orba's Don Yokubaru. After that, he leaves with Batty and the others.

Never Ending Chaos
The  are the main antagonists of the second half of the series, whose goal is to unleash chaos upon the world in form of their grand master, Deusmast, consuming the world. Deusmast was sealed within the Sun by Mother Rapapa

The main antagonist of the second half of the series, an evil chaos deity that consumes worlds whose foretold return played in Kushe's transformation into Dokurokushe. Though Mother Rapapa sealed Deusmast in the sun, the Dark Magicians' actions enabled Deusmast to create constructs in the form of the Endless Chaos members who prepare Earth for Deusmast's eventual return. Though three of the Endless Chaos members were sent back to the sun, the seal eventually broke and a reconstituted Deusmast fused the No Magic World and Magic World into one. But Deusmast was killed when the Cures manage to destroy all of them with Extreme Rainbow, separating the worlds while sending Deusmast into oblivion. Deusmast talks with all four voices of the Endless Chaos members, who form the orb-like eyes resolving around his body.

The first of the Never Ending Chaos the Precure encountered, a sly and easygoing genie who considered himself superior of magicians due to his innate level of magic and ability to bend reality with a snap of his fingers. Labut emerged from his lamp following Dokurokushe's demise and revived Yamoh to do his dirty work in destroying the Cures for him before using Don Yokubaru after the Dark Magician failed him. Labut later takes battles into his hands by throwing the Cures into a different dimension where he showed his true god-like form, eventually separating them into different parts of the dimension. After Mirai saved her teammates, they killed him in their Over the Rainbow forms with his essence sent into the sun. Though revived and becoming 1/4 of Deusmast, Labut is killed again when Cures killed Deusmast as a whole.

A serious and quiet tengu-like man who is dressed up in traditional Japanese clothing and talks like a soldier. He orders Chikurun to steal Linkle Stones for him. He then enlarges himself and swallow the Linkle Stones but Chikurun retrieved them again. He injured Chikurun, the Cures' feelings for Chikurun let them overpower him before they killed him with Extreme Rainbow. Though revived and becoming 2/4 of Deusmast, Shakince is killed again when the Cures killed Deusmast as a whole.

A Raijin-like woman who possesses the lightning-based powers, teleporting with it. Her speech reminds of a gyaru. She wears armour on her arms and legs and is surrounded by a red, thorny halo. She is the only one left after her comrades kept losing to Pretty Cure. During the final battle, she used her teammates' powers to assume her demonic form to fight the Cures, she is almost killed, until she becomes 3/4 of Deusmast, making her the only member to never be defeated by the Cures until she is fused. Benigyo was killed again when the Cures killed Deusmast.

A cold and condescending figure in the form of a fallen angel who seeks to study his enemies first before attacking them. He manipulated Chikurun into working for him. He stole Dokurokushe's book and uses it to revive the Magician Trio so he can study dark magic. He confronts the Cures, but was betrayed by Sparda, who tries to steal the book back after he started to mock dark magic and her old master. He assumed his demonic form to turn Sparda and Gamets back into their animal forms for their betrayal and the Cures killed him with Extreme Rainbow, but he still manages to revive his Endless Chaos comrades around the world with Dokurokushe's book before he dies. Though revived and becoming 4/4 of Deusmast, Orba is killed again when Cures killed Deusmast.

Monsters

The monsters of the series, created by the Dark Magicians with dark magic by fusing two objects together by using a wand with a skull head. A new Yokubaru has a red skull and were created by using Dokurokushe's bones called . A further new Yokubaru called , who were created by Never Ending Chaos generals with a round shaped face. Another Yokubaru created by Magician Trio now have black skull and they are more powerful than the usual Yokubaru. Their name  means covetousness while  means "greed" and "avarice".

Others

A bee-like fairy from Fairy Village serving Orba as his spy to get information on the Cures to get information about them, taking an interest in Mofurun. When Chikurun steals the Linkle Stones, the fairy was exposed as a spy. After Chikurun retrieved back the Linkle Stones from Shakince, he was forgiven. It remained in his homeland. Later on, it provides Yamoh with honey in order to make Dokurokushe, the spirit of Dokurokushe’s sweet tooth, happy.

Other characters

Mirai's father and Kyoko's husband, who is a Consumer Electronics Maker.

Mirai's grandmother and Kyoko's mother, who gave her Mofurun when she was a baby. She is very caring and always believes Mirai's stories about magicians. She met the Headmaster when she was younger and saved her cat.

A wizard who sells uniforms.

A wizard who sells Magic Brooms.

A wizard who sells fruits and vegetables.

An elderly wizard who likes to spread rumors.

   

Mirai and Riko's friends and classmates.

Mirai and Riko's homeroom teacher.

A famous archaeologist in the Magic World and Riko and Liz's father.

A famous cooking expert in the Magic World and Riko and Liz's mother.

The current queen of the Fairy Village.

The former queen of the Fairy Village.

The protector of earth. She sealed Deusmast and his minions before losing her powers, thus creating both Magical Realm and Non-Magic Realm. Her powers were inherited to Kotoha.

 

A pink-colored Pretty Cure from Kirakira Pretty Cure a la Mode.

Movie Characters
 

The main antagonist of the film, He is a black bear who wish to help people but flee because they fear him, this makes him bear a vendetta towards people and brainwashed to take an appearance of adult bear wearing a mask. He captures Mofurun to help her make her wish come true but she escapes. He takes the form of a young bear to manipulate Mofurun until he reveals himself. He attacks the Cures but Mofurun lets herself be defeated to make him snap out of it. Dark Matter come out of his body and he help the Cures to face Dark Matter. After the end of the movie, a now magic-less Kumata becomes friends with the bears of the forest.
 
Dark Matter's magic helpers. He summons them when he attacks the Grand Magic Festival and again when Mofurun runs away from his lair. Some of them possessed the Flare Dragon and turned it into a Shadow Dragon. After Kumata loses his magic power, it turns into a giant version of these shadows.
 

A flare dragon who performs tricks in the Grand Magic Festival's Circus Balloon. Kotoha is able to communicate with it and together they spew a fireball and turn it into fireworks. When Dark Matter disrupts the festival and abducts both the Wishing Stone and Mofurun, he also turns the Flare Dragon into a Shadow Dragon and flies away on it. Later, when the girls are looking for Mofurun, the Shadow Dragon shows up again and attacks them. Being the only one left who can do so, Kotoha transforms into Cure Felice and distracts it while the others go ahead to Dark Matter's lair. When Cure Mofurun is fighting an enraged Dark Matter while Mirai frees Riko, Cure Felice returns together with the Flare Dragon. The others are surprised to see it, but Felice explains how she discovered that the Shadow Dragon was actually the Flare Dragon, possessed by Dark Matter's shadows. She used Pink Tourmaline to get rid it of the shadows. After that, the Flare Dragon helps the Cures fly out of Dark Matter's lair. Later, it helps them break into the giant shadow to battle its core Pure Shadow Matter.

They live in the forest. Mofurun meets them when she escapes from Dark Matter's lair, and quickly becomes good friends with them. When Kumata shows up, they all flee or hide because they're afraid of his magic power. Mofurun is the only one who isn't scared of magic. When everyone is wishing for Mofurun to come back alive and shouting "Cure Up・RaPaPa!", the bears join in with "Kumappu・KuMaMa!". At the end of the movie, Kumata is accepted as one of them.

Media

Anime

The series was first revealed via a trademark filing posted on October 19, 2015, and was publicly announced on November 26, 2015. The series aired on all ANN television stations between February 7, 2016 and January 29, 2017. The series was pitched to licensors at AnimeJapan 2016 under the English name Witchy Pretty Cure, but an English adaptation has yet to be announced.

Films
The Witchy Pretty Cure have appeared in the following crossover films: Pretty Cure All Stars: Singing with Everyone♪ Miraculous Magic!, PreCure Dream Stars!, PreCure Super Stars!, and Hugtto! PreCure Futari wa Pretty Cure: All Stars Memories. A film based on the series, titled , including a fully CG animated short titled  was released on October 29, 2016.

Music
In the first 21 episodes, the opening theme is  composed by Aiko Okumura and performed by Rie Kitagawa, who previously performed the ending themes for Go! Princess PreCure, while the ending theme is  composed by Akifumi Tada and performed by Rie Takahashi and Yui Horie.

From episode 22 onwards, the opening theme is  performed by Rie Kitagawa and the ending theme is called  performed by Rie Takahashi, Yui Horie and Saori Hayami. The music is composed by Hiroshi Takaki, who previously composed the music for  DokiDoki! PreCure,  HappinessCharge PreCure!, and Go! Princess PreCure. The single was released on March 2, 2016 by Marvelous! featuring the theme songs from the first 21 episodes. The first official soundtrack of the series, titled PreCure♡Miracle☆Sound!! was released on May 25, 2016 along with the vocal album on July 13, 2016 with the title Linkle☆Melodies. The single for the second opening and ending theme was released on August 10, 2016. On November 23, 2016, the second official soundtrack of the series was released, titled PreCure☆Magical♡Sound!!.

Manga
A manga adaptation illustrated by Futago Kamikita began serialization in Kodansha's Nakayoshi magazine from February 3, 2016.

Merchandise
Bandai released various merchandise during the series including watches, bags, and transformation items.

Witchy PreCure! will also be branded as official Tokyo 2020 mascots as merchandise, along with other well known anime series like One Piece, Dragon Ball, Naruto and Sailor Moon.

References

External links
 
Witchy Pretty Cure! at ABC 

2016 anime television series debuts
2017 Japanese television series endings
2016 manga
2017 comics endings
Magical girl anime and manga
Pretty Cure
Witchcraft in anime and manga
Cancelled Nintendo 3DS games
Toei Animation television
TV Asahi original programming
Television series about witchcraft
Witchcraft in written fiction